WYET (102.3 FM) is a radio station licensed to New Carlisle, Indiana. Owned by Sound Management (d/b/a Artistic Media Partners), it broadcasts a classic hits format targeting the South Bend, Indiana market.

History

In October 2016 WYXX broke away from its simulcast of WSMM's classic hits format, "The Stream". Later that same month, the station flipped to a 1980s centric format as "All 80's 102.3" with new call letters WYET.  After several format adjustments, WYET rebranded as "Throwback 102.3" on September 3, 2021.

References

External links

YET
St. Joseph County, Indiana
Radio stations established in 1990
1990 establishments in Indiana
Classic hits radio stations in the United States